Vutsov is a Bulgarian surname  Вуцов. Notable people with the surname include:

Ivan Vutsov (born 1939), Bulgarian footballer and manager
Petar Vutsov
Svetoslav Vutsov
Velislav Vutsov (born 1967), Bulgarian footballer and manager

Bulgarian-language surnames